The Chara (Çaara) is a left tributary of the Olyokma in Eastern Siberia, Russia.

Together with the Olyokma, river Chara gives its name to the Olyokma-Chara Plateau (Олёкмо-Чарское плоскогорье), located to the east of its eastern bank.

History
The region is famous for a peculiar mountain where charoite has been mined for decades. This intensely purple mineral, named after the river, is only found here and was discovered in the 1940s when a rail tunnel was constructed. Part of the Russian governmental debt was paid in charoite and slabs of this now expensive ornamental material were stored in basements of houses of the Hungarian capital city, Budapest.

Course
The Chara begins as an outflow of Bolshoye Leprindo lake in the Kodar Mountains, Stanovoy Highlands in northern Zabaykalsky Krai. It flows through the Chara Basin between the Kodar and Kalar Mountains, passing the Chara Sands, a  area of active sand dunes. It joins the left bank of the Olyokma not far form its mouth in the Lena. The most important are the Apsat and the Zhuya from the left and the Tokko from the right. The Sen River flows into the left bank of the Chara from the northern end of lake Nichatka.

See also
Charoite
List of rivers of Russia
Patom Highlands

References

Stanovoy Highlands
Rivers of Buryatia